The Dodge WC series (nicknamed "Beeps") is a range of light 4WD and medium 6WD military utility trucks, produced by Dodge and Fargo during World . Together with the -ton jeeps produced by Willys and Ford, the Dodge tons and tons made up nearly all of the light 4WD trucks supplied to the U.S. military in WWII – with Dodge contributing some 337,500 4WD units (over half as many as the jeep).

Contrary to the versatility of the highly standardized jeep, which was mostly achieved through field modification, the Dodge WCseries came in many different, purpose-built, but mechanically uniform variants from the factory, much akin to the later family of High Mobility Multipurpose Wheeled Vehicles. The WC series evolved out of, and was part of a more extended family of trucks, with great mechanical parts commonality, that included open- and closed-cab cargo trucks and weapons carriers, (radio) command cars, reconnaissance vehicles, ambulances, carryalls, panel vans, and telephone installation and mobile emergency / field workshop trucks.

The Dodge WC series were essentially built in two generations. From 1940 to early 1942, almost 82,400 of the ton 4×4 Dodge trucks were built — initially called the VC series, but the great majority (from 1941) in the WC series, and in more variants. Contrary to what Dodge's nomenclature suggested, the 1941 WC models were a direct evolution of the 1940 VC models, retaining the U.S. Army's  Ordnance Corps Supply Catalog number.

In 1942, the payload was uprated, and the trucks became the shorter , ton, 4×4 Truck (Dodge), and the longer 1943, 1ton, 6x6 personnel and cargo truck (Dodge) — confusingly retaining Dodge WC model codes. Although the tons featured significant design improvements, they did retain some 80% interchangeable components and service parts with the ton models — a vital Army requirement, for field maintenance and operability of the trucks.

Dodge was the U.S. Army's main supplier of ton trucks, and its sole supplier of both ton trucks and 1ton 6x6 trucks in World War II. With over a quarter million units built through August 1945, the  tons were the most common variants in the WCseries.
After the war, Dodge developed the -ton WCseries into the civilian 4×4 Dodge Power Wagon; and in 1951, the WCs were replaced by the very similar ton 4x4 Dodge M-series vehicles .

Though the majority of Dodges built were 'Weapons Carriers', "WC" was not abbreviated from this, but a general Dodge model code – initially "W" for 1941, and "C" for a (nominal) half-ton payload rating.
All in all, not counting mechanically related variants, the WC series alone involved 52 model versions (thirty ton 4×4, eight ton 4×2, twelve ton 4×4, and two 1ton 6×6 models). Creating vehicles of a common platform in such a variety of designs, with payloads ranging from ton to 1tons, had no equal in its time, and is seen as an extraordinary feat of the WWII American auto industry.

History and design

1900–1939 — Dodge Brothers start making cars and 4x4 trucks for the U.S. Army

Dodge had been the United States military's primary supplier of light wheeled vehicles, since before the U.S. joined the First World War. After starting business in 1900, producing precision engine and chassis components for other car builders in Detroit — Ford and Oldsmobile chief among these — Dodge introduced their first car, the Model 30/35 tourer, in 1914. It was stronger and more high quality than the ubiquitous Ford , and in 1916, Dodge cars proved their durability, both in the 1910s U.S.–Mexico Border War — the U.S. military's first operation to use truck convoys, as well as in World War I, when some 12,800 Dodge cars and light trucks were used, primarily as ambulances and repair trucks., but also as staff and reconnaissance vehicles. All the while, Dodge maintained its reputation for high quality truck, transmission, and motor parts they made for other successful manufacturers.

Dodge light trucks were initially based largely on their passenger cars, but later specific truck chassis and bodies were designed. Light- and medium-duty models were offered first, then a heavy-duty range was added during the 1930s and 1940s. Dodge developed its first four-wheel drive truck in 1934 — an experimental 1 ton for the U.S. Army, designated K-39-X-4(USA), of which 796 units were built in several configurations. Timken supplied driven front axles and transfer-cases, which were added to a militarized commercial truck. The Timken transfer case was the first part-time design, that allowed the driver to engage or disengage four-wheel drive using a lever inside the cabin. In spite of the limited 1930s U.S. military budgets, the '34 truck was liked well-enough that the 1 tonners were further developed. Dodge built the U.S. Army further batches of 4WD 1-ton cargo trucks in 1938, 1939 and 1940.

In 1938, a batch of 1,700 experimental RF-40-X-4(USA) trucks were procured, and a further 292 experimental types TF-40-X-4(USA) in 1939. All of these 1-ton Army 4x4s rode on a  wheelbase, and the 1938 RF-40 and 1939 TF-40 trucks were the first to receive a Dodge engineering code in the 200 range (T-200 and T-201 respectively).

However, Dodge also eagerly pursued military contracts for half-ton four-by-fours at the same time. The smaller size had outperformed the 1-ton 4x4 during testing in 1938, and Dodge had invested greatly in half- to one-ton trucks in prior years. In 1936, Dodge's light, car-based trucks had been crucially redesigned — abandoning the use of Dodge car frames, instead for the first time built on distinct, modern truck-style chassis, with side rails welded to the cross members on their half-ton to one-ton rated trucks. Additionally, Dodge had built their all new, very large Warren Truck Assembly plant in Michigan, specifically for mass-production of light and medium trucks, opened in 1938.

Then, for the 1939 model year, Dodge again presented a completely redesigned line of pickups and trucks – the art-deco styled, "Job-Rated" trucks, available in an unprecedented number of sizes and configurations, aimed to fit every imaginable job.

1940 — -ton VC and 1-ton VF models 

Well before the onset of World War II, it was clear that the USA needed to update its military. Introduction of a ton standard 4WD class meant a significant doctrine shift, away from the conventional belief that all the extra weight, costs and mechanical complexity of adding 4-wheel-drive wouldn't be worth it on any general purpose military vehicle with an off-highway payload capacity below the old 1ton standard Army cargo unit. Even in the civilian market, the use of all-wheel drive was practically non-existent in anything below . Light-duty off-roaders were a very small niche-market, filled by after-market conversions, primarily by Marmon-Herrington.

By June 1940 the Q.C. had tested and approved its first three standard commercial based, all-wheel drive trucks: the  4x4 Dodge, the GMC  6x6 and a Mack  6x6. With regards to Dodge however, the U.S. military reconsidered its preferences for the build-up for the war almost immediately after this.

Whereas in 1936, a Marmon-Herrington converted Ford had become the Army's first half-ton 4-wheel drive, and the Army had initially standardized Dodge's  4x4 truck — following Dodge's push for building tonners, after mid 1940 it was decided they preferred Dodge to build light-duty four-wheel drives, contracting for a series of half-ton trucks, while GM / Chevrolet was instead going to become the standard supplier for  trucks. Dodge successfully outbid GMC's 1939 ACK-101 half-ton truck, as well as Marmon-Herrington, who could not retrofit in the required volume or price, not to mention International's M-1-4 half-ton truck, which wasn't built until 1941, for the U.S. Marine Corps. So, when in the summer of 1940 the largest government truck contract awarded went to Chrysler's Dodge / Fargo Division, for more than 14,000 (mostly) 4x4 trucks, this was in the midst of the transition, and thus included both orders for ton and 1ton trucks, as GM / Chevy still needed to tool up for mass-producing 4WD 1-tonners.

Dodge had started developing designs for a 4x4 half-ton in 1939, and began production in earnest in 1940 — both 4x4 half-tons, as well as 1-ton 4x4 and 4x2 trucks. On all 1940 trucks, front sheetmetal was mostly identical to the commercial VC and VF models of that year, with the addition of a big brush guard mounted in front of the grille and headlights. Except for the addition of 4-wheel drive, and custom bodies on the ton command cars, the trucks followed the 1939 procurement doctrine, to "use commercial trucks with only a few modifications such as brush guards and towing pintles to fit them for military use." 

The first of the -ton, 4x4, VC series military trucks were based on Dodge's 1939 commercial, one-ton rated model TC-series. The military VC models kept the same wheelbase and got the same civilian engine upgrade for 1940, but gained four-wheel drive, and a new internal technical code: T-202. Manufacturing of the half-ton Dodge VC-models (SNL number ) began in 1940, making these the U.S. Army's first ever light-duty, mass-produced 4-wheel drive trucks. The soldiers also called the light command reconnaissance vehicles "jeeps," but this was also common with several other vehicles at the time. — before that term migrated to the quarter-tons, starting gradually in 1941.

A total of 4,640 VC models were built across six variants – mostly pick-ups and reconnaissance cars. On the other hand, an even lighter and smaller 4x4 truck was needed: a quarter-ton, that would soon replace the Dodges as the U.S.' lightest 4x4 military trucks. Although no longer standard, the VC trucks remained in use until the end of the war. The Dodge VC models were built a year ahead, and in a slightly greater number than any of the pre-standard quarter-ton jeeps that followed.

In 1940, Dodge also built 6,472 four-wheel drive 1-ton trucks, under two U.S. contracts – one awarded to Dodge, and one to Fargo. The models VF-401 to VF-407 (or engine/tech type T-203 by Dodge – and G-621 by the Army), were a continuation of their experimental pre-war predecessors, the RF-40(-X) and TF-40(-X) (or T-200 / T-201), still riding on a chassis of the same  wheelbase. Production consisted of just over 6,000 closed cab, open bed cargo trucks, plus just under 400 dump-trucks.

Like on the -ton VC-series, the 1940 VF-400 1-ton models simply used civilian front sheet-metal, based on the 1939 commercial model , with a brush-guard fitted in front of the grille and headlights — but with a Dodge developed front driving axle, directional, cross-country tires, and a military cargo body. Importantly, one thousand of the VF-400 series cargo trucks were equipped with a power take-off, gear-driven Braden model MU  capacity winch — a feature that was carried over on many of the subsequent  and  WC series models, directly from 1941. An ambulance model, was also designed, but only three units were built, likely experimental.

These proved to be the last of Dodge's 1-ton 4x4 trucks for the war. Although the Army had steadily taken the bulk of its trucks in this category from Dodge / Fargo up til then, further production of 1-ton 4x4 trucks was instead awarded to GM's Chevrolet G506, which became the standard in this segment for the rest of the war.

Aside from four-wheel drive trucks, production started for a militarized commercial 1-ton, rear-wheel drive truck in 1940 — initially Dodge's model VF-31, cargo (engineering code T-98) under the government SNL number G-618. The 4x2 model VF-31 was succeeded by the model WF-31 (internally T-118) for 1941 (closed cab tractor) and 1942 (cab and chassis) — both on a  wheelbase — and the 1942 model WF-32, closed cab, stake and platform cargo truck, on a  wheelbase. After a modest production of 516 units of the WF-31, at least 9,500 Dodge WF-32 trucks were built, mostly for lend-lease to Russia.

1941–1942 — -ton WC series

The 1940 VC-series Dodge -ton 4x4s were well liked but considered only an interim solution, because they were essentially a modified civilian truck. At the outset of World War II a more military design was laid out. Dodge evolved the 1940 VC1 to VC6 into the equally half-ton rated WC series of military light trucks, produced in 38 model variants, of which 30 were four-wheel driven, in varying amounts — thousands of some models were produced, while only a few of some others were made. Where the military VCseries still used much civilian sheet-metal, distinguished by a brush-guard in front of the grille — the WCseries came with wide-open, almost flat fenders that prevented mud build-up, clogging rotation of the wheels — as well as a redesigned, sloping nose with an integrated, round, grated grille / brush-guard. A new ambulance with a fully enclosed, all-steel box rear body was designed, on a longer, 123 inch wheelbase; and PTO-driven winches were now fitted to some models.

The ton WC models were the first all-military design Dodge developed in the build-up to full mobilization for World WarII, and they were the U.S. Army's first standard light 4x4 trucks — prior to the quarter-tons — when the U.S. formally declared war in December 1941. Soldiers would sometimes call the new vehicles 'jeeps', as was still common practice before the term migrated to the yet to be introduced Willys and Ford -tons, and eventually stuck to those.

Both the Dodge half-ton VC and WC trucks were part of the Army  series. Some 77,750 four-wheel drive ton WC numbered trucks were produced from late 1940 to early 1942, under War Department contracts. Additionally, aside from the fully military 4WD models, a small total of 1,542 two-wheel drive units retaining civilian sheet-metal were also supplied to the U.S. military, bearing WC model numbers in this same range. These models carried the SNL-code G-613, and brought the total number of half-ton WCseries up to some 79,300 units, and the grand total of all half-tonners (VC and WC; 4WD and 2WD) to almost 84,000.

From August 1941, the Dodge T-211 models received the uprated 92hp (gross) engine, that was from then on fitted to all WC trucks produced through August 1945: the T-215 half-tons, all of the G-502, -ton models, as well as the G-507, T-223, 6x6 trucks.

1942–1945 — -ton, G-502 WC series

The Quartermaster General wanted to start direct negotiations with Dodge, GM and Mack for certain models immediately, but not until after February 1941 could the Quartermaster Corps choose manufacturers directly, based on their engineering and production capabilities. One deciding factor had to do with availability of certain critical components, like transfer cases and especially constant-velocity joints, not used much on commercial trucks, but all-wheel drive vehicles all needed these; plus additionally, they would use two or three times the amount of driven axles, meaning more gears to cut for all the differentials. Produced up to the war by a few specialized firms with limited capacity, from spring 1942 Ford, Dodge and Chevrolet joined in fabricating these in mass quantity, with Dodge's experience in making quality, precision parts dating back from the earliest beginnings of the company.

While very successful, the -ton WC trucks had to be supplanted by new ton trucks. The ton featured a lower profile truck bed that could seat eight troops, plus under seat stowage compartments; while service-parts remained 80 percent interchangeable with the existing ton series. Maintaining 80% service parts interchangeability with the ton models was of great value. The ton models could swiftly be deployed, and the ton,  WCtrucks remained in use to the end of World War II.

Throughout the war, Dodge was the U.S. Army's sole producer of ton trucks, and built a total of 255,193 of these across all variants from April 1942 to August 1945.
Standard vehicles in the ton 4x4 class were the  /  Weapons Carrier,    (Radio) Command Reconnaissance,  Carryall, and the  Ambulance.

1943–1945 — -ton, G-502 and 1-ton, 6x6,  WC series

After the U.S. Army reorganized from using eight-troop rifle squads to twelve-men squads, a single squad could no longer be carried as a unit in the ton, 4x4,  and  trucks. At the direction of Major General Courtney Hodges, Chief of Infantry, the  troop- and weapons-carriers were thus in 1943 stretched with an additional driven rear axle, to derive  longer 6-wheel drive, 1ton trucks. Using the same engine, gearbox, and cockpit, and sharing much of the other mechanicals, plus near-identical front-half sheet-metal as the -tons, the new 6x6, 1tons' main difference was the use of a dual-range transfer-case, sourced out of the prior 1940, 1ton VF-400 models, instead of the single-speed box of the-tons and -tons.

The latter was of course equipped with a longer frame, housing an engine power take-off drive-shaft from the transfer-case forward, to drive a Braden MU2 winch, mounted on a  more protruding front-bumper, reducing the approach angle.

The chassis and certain other components were strengthened in the design of the new, longer, double the payload rated models, and many of these changes were incorporated back into subsequent production of the -ton  models as well. Although this caused some inconsistency in the mechanical uniformity of the -tons, it did keep parts the same as much as possible between the -tons and the new 1-tons, benefiting both the uniformity and ease of production of all the different models, as well as the tons, making them even more rugged from then on.

Further developments
Amphibious

Twelve G-614 half-ton capacity, 4x4, XAC-2 / experimental 'Aqua-Cheetah', amphibious vehicles were built in 1942, by the Amphibian Car Corporation. One unit was submitted to Britain for testing, (under Lend-Lease), and the remaining eleven were subsequently rebuilt by the same firm, as G-552, XAC-3, amphibious 3/4ton trucks. Both the tons and the tons were built based on Dodge WC series mechanicals. The vehicles performed well in testing, but neither Britain nor the U.S. decided to standardize them.

Armored

A single armored car prototype was built, based on the 1ton, 6x6, Dodge .

Models table – overview

This table provides the relations between U.S. military and Dodge identification numbers, chassis payload classification in U.S. tons (907 kg), wheels and drive, and description of body fitted, according to the U.S. Army Ordnance SNL supply list. 
The U.S. government used category numbers starting with 'G-', whereas Dodge used technical category numbers starting with a 'T', and model numbers starting with two letters, like 'WC-'. The U.S. Army simply considered the 1941 Dodge WC series as evolutions of the initial 1940 VC series – all within the half-ton, 4x4, SNL  trucks.

In the case of two vehicle identifications separated by a slash, the first code refers to the vehicle without a winch, and the second code, in bold print, to the same vehicle, on a longer frame, holding a front winch, typically resulting in a  longer front overhang, and distinctly reduced approach angle. Not only were the winches driven by a power take-off from the engine, but unlike the later Dodge M-series trucks, on which an extension was bolted to the frame when mounting a winch — on the WCseries the winch equipped versions actually had a different frame.

On the 1-ton rated VF-400 series trucks, the PTO-driven winch had a 10,000 pound capacity, but added almost 1,000 pounds to the vehicles weight, reducing the payload to 2400 pounds.

Numbers separated by a comma indicate similar models but with different secondary details.

Engines and drivetrains
All engines were liquid-cooled, straight-six Chrysler flathead gasoline engines, mated to four-speed manual transmissions and a single-range transfer-case offering part-time four-wheel drive. Only the T203 and the T223 configurations applied in the 1ton  models, and in the  6×6 trucks had a dual-ratio transfer-case.

Half-ton VC series

The 1940 Dodge / Fargo VC models formed the first production run in the U.S. military's  range of half-ton, light four-wheel drive military trucks. Created based on Chrysler's 1939 commercial, one-ton rated, TC models of light trucks and carry-all, the VC models formed the foundation for the subsequent 1941, ton WC series. (The company's naming system then progressed the first letter alphabetically per model year, and the second letter tied to the truck's payload rating, based on chassis and components strength.)

All variants used the same  wheelbase as the civilian trucks, but with the addition of part-time four-wheel drive. Bodywork and sheet metal on the pick-ups and carryall were largely copied from the civilian models — however, for the reconnaissance and radio cars, a dedicated open four seater body was created, manufactured by Budd Company. The transmission had 4 speeds, and the transfer case just one – it only shifted drive to the front axle, to engage or disengage four-wheel drive; on-road it remained rear-wheel drive.

VC-1: Command Reconnaissance – 2,155 units
VC-2: Radio Command Reconnaissance – 34 units
VC-3: Closed cab Pickup with bed seating for troops – 816 units
VC-4: Closed cab Pickup without bed seats – 4 units
VC-5: Open cab Pickup with bed seating for troops – 1,607 units
VC-6: Carry-all – 24 units
None of these trucks came with winches yet.

Half-ton WC series
The half-ton, 4x4, Dodge WC series were evolutionary redesigns of the preceding VC series, retaining the military  series code. Starting production in late 1940, until replacement by the 3/4ton models in early 1942, they progressed through three mechanical engineering versions (and ), in barely a year and a half – while receiving the  specification engine midway through production of the  coded versions.

The WC series is immediately recognizable by its redesigned, now military sheet-metal. Wide-open, simplified front and rear fenders replaced the bulbous civilian ones, offering more wheel-travel, and less risk of wheels clogging stuck with thick mud in the wheel-well. The front brush-guard and grille were redesigned, replacing the civilian art-deco front with a single, integrated, upright, round welded grate.

The distribution across the versions was: 
28,537 units of the WC-21 through WC-27 and WC-40 through  model, with the  engineering code and a  engine with 92 HP.

The T-207 range had an uprated 85 hp engine, and these units had front axles with Bendix-Weiss constant-velocity joints, whereas  and  models were given front axles either made by Bendix or with Rzeppa design CV joints, made by Ford.

From the T-211 models onwards, the rear brakes were  instead of  drums.  Among the  versions, no single WC model number was explicitly used for winch-equipped units.

The T-215 types introduced a military design dashboard with round gauges, replacing the civilian dash with square ones.

A further 1,542 rear-wheel drive units (engineering code T-112) were built as  through , and  through  — mostly carry-alls and pick-ups). These retained civilian bodywork, fenders and grilles, as well as regular front axles, and a one-ton on-road rating.

Common specifications
Wheelbase:  – both on four-wheel and two-wheel drive models
except  for ambulances and phone line / emergency repair trucks
Track width:  front –  rear
except  front track on rear-wheel drive models
Tires: 7.50×16
Brakes: Hydraulic
Engine: 6 cylinder, in-line, side valve engine
Transmission: manual, 4 forward / 1 reverse
Transfer case: Single speed

-ton Ambulances
WC-9, WC-18, WC-27

Entering production during 1941 to early 1942, they were specifically designed to serve as military ambulances. These early variants are distinguishable from the later ones by having a curved radiator grille, while the later ones ( onwards) featured a flat grille. These versions were given a longer  wheelbase.
Length: 
Width: 
Height: 
Weight: 
Payload:

-ton Carry-alls
WC-10, WC-17, WC-26, WC-36, WC-48

-ton (Radio) Command Reconnaissance
WC-6, WC-15, WC-23

Command / reconnaissance cars.

WC-7, WC-24

Command / reconnaissance car with winch.

WC-8, WC-16, WC-25

Radio car / Command reconnaissance car with radio, 12 volt.

-ton Trucks, Closed Cab
WC-1, WC-5, WC-12, WC-14, WC-40

The  engine displacement was increased to the T-215's volume of  mid-series, after engine No. 42001.

-ton Trucks, Open Cab

WC-3, WC-13, WC-21

Weapon carriers, two seater pickups with open cab. The open cab pickups could be fitted with an optional M24 machine gun mount, which bolted across the front of the bed. The mount could carry the M1918 Browning Automatic Rifle, as well as the M1919 Browning machine gun, and the 0.5 in (12.7 mm) M2 Browning machine gun.
Length: 
Width: 
Height: with top 
Weight: 
Payload: 

WC-4, WC-22

Open cab weapons carrier, with Braden MU winch, and transverse seats, designed to tow the 37mm M3 anti-tank gun as well as carry the gun crew and ammunition. This type was usually issued to early tank destroyer units. 5570 built.
Length: 
Width: 
Height: with top 
Weight:  net
Payload:

-ton (Radio) Panel Vans

WC-11, WC-19, WC-42

Almost 1,400 panel van trucks, and panel van bodied radio communication cars. The subsequent  panel vans were however furnished and equipped as radio communication cars. The 650  radio panel vans almost outnumbered their bare transportation siblings, and they were also the only radio communication cars that Dodge built in a panel van body style in the entire VC and WC series range.

Almost half of production, 650 units, went to the British Empire under the U.S. Lend-Lease agreement.

-ton Telephone Service

WC-39, WC-43, WC-50

These models were built as technical service trucks for the U.S. Army Signal Corps, designed to install and repair hard telephone lines.

Of the two-wheel drive WC-39 and WC-50, only a single unit of each were built, but the four-wheel drive  numbered 370 units.

-ton Trucks, Emergency Repair

WC-5, WC-14, WC-20, WC-40, WC-41

Just over one thousand emergency repair chassis and trucks were ordered within the half-ton Dodge , WC series.

Most were furnished with third party utility service rear bodies, as M1 emergency repair trucks, to provide mobile facilities for emergency ordnance repair ( / ). One other body-type was ordered: one T-211 oil servicing truck in 1941.

Three-quarter-ton models

By late 1941, the Dodge WC range was significantly revised. All four-wheeled models were reinforced and uprated for a nominal three-quarter ton off-road payload; and for 1943, a stretched six-wheel drive, 1-ton rated variant was developed.

The tires were widened from 7.50×16 to 9 inches (from 19 cm to 23 cm) wide. moreover, the bulk production variants were significantly shortened, giving the vehicles much more square proportions, like on their younger ton brothers. Only ambulances, carry-alls, and technical service trucks kept a long wheelbase. Panel vans were dropped from the range and no longer made.

The big volume models (the WC-51/-52, and the WC-56/-57/-58) also got literally more square bodies, and overall length to width ratios. The integrated grille / brush-guard became straight, and the hoods (bonnets) became lower and wider, and were flattened – both as in losing their previous curvature, and now being simply horizontal – so they became more useful as an improvised table-top, and the front windows / windshields on these models could now also be folded forward, to lay flat on their hoods, just like on the -tons. Under the hood, the -tons kept the 6-cylinder inline, L-head engine of 92 hp (73 kW) gross, from the later model halfton WC series.

The biggest volume production variants, the pick-up / troops and weapons-carrier models, received a completely redesigned rear bed, that mostly consisted of two longitudinal, rectangular boxes, that integrated the rear wheel wells with under-seat stowage compartments fore and aft of the rear wheels, while now seating troops on top of the rear wheels, facing each other, instead of in between the wheels, further widening these models to 6 ft 11 in (2.11 m), but offering much more space for the troops' backpacks and gear, between their feet. Asingle such truck, at less than ( long, offered practical all-terrain transportation to a full eight man rifle squad, their weapons and personal kit.

With the nickname 'jeep' now moving on to the smaller ton trucks, some soldiers called the Dodges 'Beeps' (for "Big jeep") instead.

Eventually, as much as half of the more than fifty different WCseries models manufactured, were WC51 & WC52 cargo/troop and weapons carriers — and one third of those with an engine-powered front winch.

-ton Ambulances

WC-54

The WC-54 Truck, 3/4 ton, 4×4 Ambulance, Dodge (G-502), was produced as an ambulance, but a few were modified to serve as radio/telephone trucks with the US Signal Corps.

Length: 
Width: 
Height: 
Weight: 
Payload: 

WC-64

The WC-64 KD Truck, 3/4 ton, 4x4 Ambulance Dodge (G-502) was an ambulance based on the same chassis as the  but with a knock-down body designed to increase the number of vehicles that could be shipped at the same time. The rear boxes were supplied in two major parts: lower and upper. The lower part of the box was attached to the chassis at the factory, while the upper box was crated for installation in the field. 3,500 Knock-down ambulances were built between the beginning of 1945 and the end of the war, the great majority (2,531 units) went to allies under lend-lease:
1,123 to the Free French forces
644 to British Commonwealth
475 to China
149 to Brazil and 82 to other Latin American republics

-ton Carryall

WC-53

A carryall, mechanically the WC-53 was virtually identical to the  but was fitted with a body which was the 1939 civilian carryall modified to military specifications. All four rear side windows were wind-up opening and the seating consisted of front folding passenger seat to allow rear access, two person second row leaving space to access to the rear full width three person seat. The spare wheel was carried on a mount on the driver's side and although the door was fully operational it could not be opened and the driver had to enter from the passenger side. The rear end had split tailgates.
WC-53s were also fitted as radio trucks with a bench on the left side with the operator seated sideways. 8,400 : Truck, 3/4 ton, 4×4 Dodge Carryall were built. No carryalls came from the factory with a winch, though there was a field modification available.

Length: 
Width: 
Height: 
Weight: 
Payload:

-ton (Radio) Command Reconnaissance
WC-56

The WC-56 Truck, Command Reconnaissance, 3/4 ton, 4x4 w/o Winch, Dodge was a command and reconnaissance vehicle akin to a large quarter-ton jeep. It did not prove popular as it was heavier and not as maneuverable as the jeep, and its distinctive profile made it a target. The soft-top included side-curtains, for better weather shielding.  21,156 units were built.

Length: 13 ft 10 in (4.22 m)
Width: 6 ft 7 in (2.00 m)
Height: 6 ft 9 in (2.07 m)
Weight: 5,335 lb (2,420 kg)
Payload: 1,750 lb (800 kg)

WC-57

Length: 14 ft 8 in (4.46 m)
Width: 6 ft 7 in (2.00 m)
Height: 6 ft 9 in (2.07 m)
Weight: 5,644 lb ( 2,560 kg)
Payload: 1,750 lb (800 kg)

WC-58

The WC-58 Truck, Radio, 3/4 ton, 4×4 w/o Winch, Dodge (G-502) was identical to the  Command / Reconnaissance Car, but fitted with a Signal Corps Radio set in front of the rear seat, and a 12-volt electrical system. A total of 2,344 radio equipped units were built, but it is unclear whether these were included as part of the  /  production, or constituted an additional 2,344  radio car units.

Length: 13 ft 10 in (4.22 m) / 14 ft 7 in (4.46 m) with winch
Width: 6 ft 7 in (2.00 m)
Height: 6 ft 9 in (2.07 m)
Weight: 5,644 lb (2,560 kg)
Payload: 1,750 lb (800 kg)

-ton Trucks, Weapons Carrier
WC-51 and WC-52

The G-502, WC-51 & WC-52: "Truck, Cargo, -ton, 4x4, Weapons Carrier" (from early 1942), had largely redesigned bodies and frames, compared to their half-ton, 1940–1941 forebears, yet retained mechanically as much as possible — improving what was necessary, while maintaining supply, logistics, and training continuity. The design was now blatantly more jeep-like, with a much shorter, lower, wider, versatile, open cab pickup body. The hood became flat and horizontal, and the windshield could now also be folded forward, flat on it. Engine and drive-train were almost completely carried over from the  half-tons, except for the uprated, wider track axles, which were now  closer together, for a  wheelbase.

The WC-51 and -52 could be fitted with an optional M24A1 machine gun mount, or other devices. The M24A1 mount bolted across the front of the bed, and could carry the M1918 Browning Automatic Rifle, the M1919 Browning machine gun, or the M2 Browning machine gun.
Lack of a winch gave the  a  shorter front overhang, and thus a better approach angle. With about every third unit carrying a winch, these were thus rarely ever retrofitted.

When adding the 5,380 , M6 Gun Motor Carriages, that were later downgraded back to  specification, it brings the total number to over 188,000 of these models. Although nearly a quarter of that (44,229) were passed on to allies, mostly through Lend-Lease, once the 1939 U.S. Army reorganization from 8man to 12man (rifle) squads got tied more closely into troop-car procurement, Dodge received orders for a similar amount (43,224 built) of the stretched, 12troop (one squad) capacity,  & , 1ton, 6x6 trucks.

Length: 13 ft 11 in (4.24 m) – 14 ft 9 in (4.48 m) with winch
Width: 6 ft 11 in (2.11 meters)
Height (with canvas cover): 6 ft 10 in (2.08 m)
Height (with top down): 5 ft 2 in (1.57 m)
Weight: 5,250 lb (2,382 kg) net – 5,550 lb (2,518 kg) net with winch
Payload: 1,750 lb (800 kg)
Tires: 9.00 x 16 in., 8ply

A substantial amount – almost a quarter – of all the ton weapons carriers (a total of 44,229  and  trucks), were provided through Lend-Lease to various Allies:
24,902 to the Soviet Union, who used some to pull their ZiS-3 76-mm anti-tank guns,
10,884 to Britain
3,711 to China
3,495 to the Free French forces
954 to Brazil and 204 to other Latin American countries

-ton Truck, M6 Gun Motor Carriage

WC-55

The M6 37 mm Gun Motor Carriage, 3/4-ton, 4×4 (abbreviated as M6 GMC), or fully described "M6 Fargo Gun Motor Carriage with 37mm Anti-tank Gun," (by Dodge numbered ), was a modified  Dodge , designed and built to carry an M3A1 37mm anti-tank gun combined with gun shield, mounted on its cargo bed, facing rearward. The  with gun combination was designated by Standard Nomenclature List supply catalog number . A total of 5,380 were built by Fargo in 1942, but most were later dismantled / downgraded and returned to service as  cargo trucks.

Fielded as a stopgap design from late 1942 in North Africa, in limited use with the US Army Tank Destroyer Battalions, and in the Pacific War in 1943/1944, improvements in enemy tanks quickly rendered the 37mm gun underpowered, and better guns became available. The  was first downgraded to "limited standard" in 1943, and subsequently declared obsolete, finally by early 1945.

Length: 14 ft 8 in (4.48 m)
Width: 7 ft 2 in (2.18 m)
Height: 8 ft 2 in (2.49 m) to top of gun shield
Weight: 5,600 lb (2 540 kg)
Storage: 80 rounds of 37mm munitions

-ton Telephone Service

WC-59

The WC-59 Truck, Telephone Maintenance, 3/4 ton, 4×4 Dodge was designed to install and repair telephone lines. Based on the same chassis as the  ambulances, sharing a  longer wheelbase than the regular ton WC series. The spare wheel was carried behind the seats, and a step ladder fitted where the spare wheel normally would have been. 549 units were built. The bespoke bed made it a K-50 truck to the Signal Corps. These were initially fitted to both Dodge and Chevrolet chassis.

Length: 16 ft 0 in (4.88 m)
Width: 6 ft 6 in (1.98 m)
Height: 6 ft 9 in (2.06 m)
Weight: 5,357 lb (2,430 kg)
Payload: 1,750 lb (800 kg)

WC-61

The WC-61 Light Maintenance Truck, 3/4 ton, 4×4 Dodge was also designed to install and repair telephone lines. Just 58 were built. The US Signal Corps referred to these as the K-50B truck.

Length: 15 ft 6 in (4.73 m)
Width: 6 ft 10 in (2.08 m)
Height (without ladder): 7 ft 5 in (2.26 m)
Weight: 5,952 lb (2,700 kg)
Payload: 1,750 lb (800 kg)

-ton Truck, Emergency Repair
WC-60

Its open-topped service-type bed featured numerous tool trunks and stowage bins, accessible from the outside. 296 units were built.

Length: 15 ft 6 in (4.73 m)
Width: 6 ft 10 in (2.08 m)
Height: 7 ft 5 in (2.26 m)
Weight: 5,952 lb (2 700 kg)
Payload: 1,750 lb (800 kg)

One-and-a-half-ton models

WC-62
The G-507 Cargo and Personnel Carrier, 1-ton, 6x6 Truck, Dodge ( w/o Winch) was based on a lengthened  Weapons Carrier with an extra axle added. The  trucks could be driven by all six wheels (6x6) or by the four rear wheels only (6×4). A number of components were strengthened in this design, and many of these changes were also incorporated in subsequent ton production. Production amounted to 43,224 units total, — 23,092  units without winch, and 20,132  variants with winch. One prototype was produced as an armored car.

A total of 6,344 WC-62 and WC-63 cargo trucks were provided to World War II Allies — 4,074 to the Free French forces, 2,123 to British, and 137 units to Brazil.

Length: 17 ft 11 in (5.47 m)
Width: 6 ft 11 in (2.11 m)
Height (with canvas cover): 7 ft 3 in (2.21 m)
Height (with top down): 5 ft 2 in (1.57 m)
Weight: 6,925 lb (3,141 kg)
Payload: 3,300 lb (1,500 kg)

WC-63
The WC-63 Truck, Cargo and Personnel Carrier, 1 ton, 6×6 with Winch, Dodge Weapons Carrier was based on a lengthened  with an extra axle added.

Length: 18 ft 9 in (5.72 m)
Width: 6 ft 11 in (2.10 m)
Height (with canvas cover): 7 ft 3 in (2.21 m)
Height (with top down): 5 ft 2 in (1.57 m)
Weight: 7,175 lb (3,250 kg)
Payload: 3,300 lb  (1500 kg)

Comprehensive models table
The table below lists the comprehensive set of models in the Dodge WC series family showing the different codes that were assigned together with each model's core specifications.

Different colors have been used to code groupings for maximum convenience, based on nominal payload rating, model family, and wheels and drive.

Lend-lease models (mainly for Russia), and Canadian-built models are presented in red, at the bottom.

Service history

Although Chrysler / Dodge supplied over 380,000 WC-series to the war effort – more than the number of MB jeeps actually built by Willys (some 360,000), and the vehicles served with equal versatility – the Dodge WC-series, that were nicknamed "jeeps" by the soldiers, before that moniker subsequently migrated to its quarter-ton brothers, never received any comparable level of fame. The Dodge WC-series have therefore been called one of WWII's unsung heroes.

Lend-Lease
Almost 60,000 Dodge WC series models were provided to the U.S.' allies of World War II under the Lend-Lease program:
650 of the total 1,400 -ton Panel vans built, possibly with radio, went to the British,
886 -ton Carry-alls went mainly to the British and the Soviets, with small numbers to various other countries,
over 2,500 of the total 3,500 WC-64, -ton knock-down ambulances went primarily to the Free French, the British, and to China,
some 3,800 -ton WC-56 / WC-57 Command Cars (with or without winch) went mainly to the British, the Free French, and to China,
plus a further 650 -ton Radio cars, likely WC-58 model, also for the British,
the bulk of lend-lease Dodges – over 44,000 units – were WC-51 and WC-52 -ton Troops and Weapons Carriers – see their section above,
and lastly, 6,344 of WC-62 and WC-63 1-ton, 6x6 Cargo, Troops and Weapons Carriers were provided – mainly to the French (over 4,000), and to the British (over 2,000).

To the Soviets, the almost 25,000 new 1942 all-wheel drive -ton multi-purpose WC series were so fundamentally innovative, that they fitted no standard Red Army category. Russia much appreciated these vehicles, that perfectly filled the gap between 4WD automobiles and heavy trucks, and simply called them "Dodge three-quarters".

Former operators

Austrian Army
 
Belgian Army

Used in Brazil by the Brazilian Army and 
in Europe by the Brazilian Expeditionary Force,nicknamed as Jipão.

Free French Forces, French Army

Greek Army and Greek Air Force

Iranian Army

Israel Defense Forces

Guardia Nacional de Nicaragua

Norwegian Army

Portuguese Army, redesignated Dodge m/48, used during the Portuguese Colonial War

Philippine Commonwealth Army
Philippine Constabulary
 Philippine Republic
Philippine Army
Philippine Constabulary
Philippine Marine Corps

Royal Army Medical Corps

U.S Army, U.S. Army Medical Corps and U.S. Signal Corps

Red Army by Lend-Lease during World War II – according to US data: 25,202 Dodge WC series, including 24,902 WC-51 and WC-52 were sent to USSR; according to Soviet data: 19,600 Dodge WC series (Dodge 3/4) were actually delivered and assembled.
At least two survived in running condition in Russian museums:
Museum of Military History in Padikovo, Istrinsky District, Moscow Oblast.
Museum of Military and Automobile Technique in Verkhnyaya Pyshma, Sverdlovsk Oblast.

The Swiss Army bought several hundred after World War II, mainly tons, a few tons, and just ten 1tons.  ambulances served until 1960.

Gallery

In popular culture
Dodge WC series vehicles are visible in many World War II movies, and American TV series. One of the most conspicuous examples is the frequent use of the WC-54 ambulances in the acclaimed M*A*S*H TV series, situated in the Korean War.

In many WW II films, directors would place high-ranking allied officers in Dodge Command Cars, although in reality, the German military quickly realized that personnel riding in the Command Cars were typically prime targets, and Allied generals and dignitaries would in reality prefer to ride in regular jeeps, to prevent advertising themselves as high-profile targets.

See also
Canadian Military Pattern truck
Dodge 3-ton 'Burma' truck
List of Dodge automobiles
Einheits-PKW der Wehrmacht – Hitler's 1934 program making Army utility cars on standardized chassis
Standard nomenclature vehicle G-numbers – G-061, G-121, G-502, G-505, G-507, G-613, G-618, G-621
Humvee – another U.S. light military wheeled vehicle platform, with many variants built using the same mechanicals
World War II jeep – the more famous of the two American light wheeled 4WD vehicles, mass-produced for World War II

Notes

References

General references

Richards, T. and Clarke, R.M. Dodge WW2 military portfolio 1940-45. Brookland Books LTD (Surrey, UK) 

 Ten page sample here (pdf)

External links

A complete online collection Manuals for WWII Dodge WC-series 4×4 and 6×6 - by ExpODe.nl and ArmyVehicleMarking.com
Dodge WC, Primal4x4 Dodge WWII 4x4 – includes the retired "WW2 Dodge Motor Pool" site
Gordon's WW2 Army Trucks
A WC-52 Restoration Project
command-car.com – dedicated to Dodge Command Car of WW2
WW II 3/4 Ton, 4x4 Dodge WC Information Page – on Vintage Power Wagons
"The Jeep Gets a Big Brother", November 1942, Popular Science – early article introducing the American war public to the redesigned ton WCseries

WC series
Military trucks of the United States
Off-road vehicles
Soft-skinned vehicles
World War II military vehicles
World War II vehicles of the United States
Motor vehicles manufactured in the United States
Military vehicles introduced from 1940 to 1944
Military light utility vehicles